Teddington railway station is located in Teddington in the London Borough of Richmond upon Thames, in south west London, and is in Travelcard Zone 6.

The station is operated by South Western Railway, as are all trains serving it. It was listed Grade II as of historic interest in 2012.

Station layout

There are two platforms joined by a footbridge near the north-western end of the station buildings. This footbridge has a barrier running its length so that it is usable either externally to provide access from Victoria Road to Station Road or internally to provide access between the platforms. A second footbridge exists south-east of the station between a footpath off Victoria Road and the point where Station Road becomes Cromwell Road.

Service

The typical off-peak service from the station is:

6 trains per hour to London Waterloo, of which:
4 trains per hour run via Kingston and Wimbledon
2 trains per hour run via Richmond and Putney
2 trains per hour to Shepperton

On Sundays, the services run less frequently – hourly to Shepperton, to Waterloo via Kingston and Waterloo via Richmond.  There is also an hourly service between Kingston and Waterloo via .

The principal station buildings are located in Victoria Road in Teddington, although access is also available from Station Road. The Station Road entrance is a four-minute walk from Teddington High Street.

History
Several carriages of a train that had stopped at the station were destroyed in an arson attack by suffragettes on 26 April 1913.

References

External links

Railway stations in the London Borough of Richmond upon Thames
Former London and South Western Railway stations
Railway stations in Great Britain opened in 1863
Railway stations served by South Western Railway
Teddington